Half a Life is a collection of science fiction short stories by Russian novelist Kir Bulychev.

Content
The longest of the stories is also called Half a Life and tells the story of a Russian woman kidnapped by an alien spacecraft in the years following the second world war. In a distant, but unspecified future, human cosmonauts discover the alien ship floating in space, a derelict. Entering the ship, they soon realize that it was automated - run by robots with the apparent mission of collecting biologic specimens from different planets. (The purpose of this exploration remains undetermined, but one of the humans speculate that it may have been a lucky break for mankind that the ship never returned home.) One of the cosmonauts finds bits of a journal written in Russian, a diary of life aboard the spacecraft written by the abducted Russian woman, the ship's sole human occupant. Compiling the journal, the cosmonauts learn of the human author's attempts to bond with the ship's other intelligent specimens, and of their plot to escape the ship's crew of automatons. When the cosmonauts find the journal incomplete, they are forced to learn for themselves the fate of the author.

In I Was the First to Find You, the crew of the Earth ship Spartak have spent years on a deep space expedition. As Spartak flew at interstellar speeds, the gap of time between her departure and return was even greater on Earth, and her crew are forced to consider whether they have wasted their lives away.

In Protest, a famous former athlete is forced to mediate a dispute in an interplanetary Olympics competition.

In Red Deer, White Deer, human explorers discover a world having reached a state comparable to Earth's at the dawn of mankind. Fate however, has this world taking a different path.

In May I Please Speak to Nina, the narrator has been trying to reach his girlfriend Nina by phone. Instead, he keeps reaching another Nina, one who thinks that she is in the 1940s, as the Soviet Union is besieged by war. For the narrator, it is the 1970s. Perhaps the girl is playing a trick, or is actually a demented old woman for whom time has lost its meaning. The narrator, with his own bitter memories of that time, cannot discard the possibility that his phone has somehow crossed wires through time.

In Snowmaiden, human cosmonauts discover the beautiful survivor of a destroyed spaceship from another world. Despite incompatible physiologies, love blooms between the alien "snowmaiden" and one of her rescuers.

Science fiction short story collections
1975 short story collections
Russian short story collections